Abel Masuero (born 6 April 1988) is an Argentine professional footballer who plays as a centre-back for Chacarita Juniors.

Career
Masuero began his professional playing career in 2007 with Gimnasia y Esgrima de La Plata. He made his professional debut on 18 February 2007 in a 2–2 draw with Quilmes.

External links

1988 births
Living people
Footballers from Santa Fe, Argentina
Argentine footballers
Argentine expatriate footballers
Association football defenders
Argentine Primera División players
Primera Nacional players
Belgian Pro League players
Club de Gimnasia y Esgrima La Plata footballers
Ferro Carril Oeste footballers
K.R.C. Genk players
San Lorenzo de Almagro footballers
Instituto footballers
Nueva Chicago footballers
Club Atlético Patronato footballers
Club Atlético Brown footballers
Atlético de Rafaela footballers
Quilmes Atlético Club footballers
O.F. Ierapetra F.C. players
Chacarita Juniors footballers
Argentine expatriate sportspeople in Belgium
Expatriate footballers in Belgium